Nidio das Dores Neto (born 9 October 1995) or simply Nidio Neto, is a football player who currently plays for Timor-Leste national football team.

International career
Nidio made his senior international debut in an 8-0 loss against United Arab Emirates national football team in the 2018 FIFA World Cup qualification on 12 November 2015.

References

1995 births
Living people
East Timorese footballers
Timor-Leste international footballers
Association football defenders